Five Mile Point Light, also known as Five Mile Point Lighthouse or Old New Haven Harbor Lighthouse, is a U.S. lighthouse in Long Island Sound on the coast of New Haven, Connecticut. Located at the entrance to New Haven Harbor, the beacon's name derives from its proximity to Downtown New Haven, about five miles (8 km) away. The original lighthouse consisted of a  octagonal wooden tower built in 1805 by Abisha Woodward. In 1847, a new  octagonal tower was constructed by Marcus Bassett with East Haven brownstone. Also constructed at this time was a two-and-one-half story brick house which supplanted the previous, deteriorating keeper's dwelling. A fourth-order Fresnel lens replaced the lamps in 1855 and a fog bell was added in the 1860s. The Five Mile Point Light was deactivated in 1877 when the nearby Southwest Ledge Light was completed. Currently, the lighthouse is contained within Lighthouse Point Park and, along with the keeper's house, was listed on the National Register of Historic Places in 1990.

History 
During the American Revolutionary War in July 1779, a battle took place on the site of the future lighthouse when British troops anchored offshore and staged an invasion of New Haven.  Patriot forces launched a defense of the beachfront as the attackers landed their boats.  Ensign and Adjutant Watkins of the King's American regiment was the first of the British soldiers killed in the skirmish, shot while attempting to disembark on the shoreline.  He was buried close to where the lighthouse at Five Mile Point would eventually be erected a few decades later.  Although the British went on to burn the nearby house of Amos Morris and several other residences in the area, they suffered heavy losses and ultimately abandoned their advance on New Haven.

Original tower
In 1804, the United States Congress passed a statute requiring the secretary of the treasury to build a lighthouse at Five Mile Point if land could be obtained for a reasonable price. That same year, Amos Morris, Jr., son of the man whose home was the first to be razed during the 1779 British invasion, sold a suitable one-acre plot of his father's coastal estate to the federal government for $100. On March 16, 1805, an appropriation for $2500 was issued for the construction of the lighthouse. Late that year, a  octagonal wooden tower was built by Abisha Woodward on the southwest edge of the harbor and to mark the path around the Southwest Ledge. The fixed white light was made by eight oil lamps with  parabolic reflectors, but it was criticized for being too dim. The lighthouse also had a keeper's quarters constructed in 1805. The first keeper of the light was Amos Morris Jr., for a period of just three weeks. In 1838,  Lieutenant George M. Bache reported that the wooden tower and keeper's house was in a poor state. Congress would appropriate $10,000 to construct a new stone lighthouse on March 3, 1847.

Current tower 

Constructed in 1847, the new  octagonal tower was constructed by Marcus Bassett with East Haven brownstone from Jabez Potter's quarry. The interior of the lighthouse was lined with New Haven brick and a 74-step granite stairway leads to the cast-iron lantern. Also constructed was a new two-and-one-half story brick house to replace the one in a "very bad state of repair". The light would be replaced with a fourth-order Fresnel lens in 1855. In the 1860s, a fog bell was also added.

The lighthouse was extinguished in 1877 when the offshore Southwest Ledge Light replaced it for navigation. The keeper, Elizur Thompson, went to be the Southwest Ledge Light's keeper for five years before returning to live in the Five Mile Point Light keeper's quarters and fly storm signal flags for the United States Weather Bureau. In 1896, the lighthouse was transferred to the United States Department of War and was improved by a leasee named Albert Widmann. In 1922, the property was split up, with the land given to the state of Connecticut and the buildings to the city of New Haven. Two years later, New Haven purchased the land from the state for $11,180. The tower was renovated in 1986. The $86,000 restoration included repairing cracked mortar, steam cleaning the interior and exterior and removing "guano [that had] accumulated over the decades".

Importance 
Roth and Clouette note that the "Five Mile Point Lighthouse is significant because it embodies the distinctive characteristics of American lighthouse construction during the first half of the 19th century ... [it] is also significant in the maritime history of New Haven." The keeper's dwelling currently is a private residence for New Haven Recreation Department personnel and has been modified with the addition of a porch. The lighthouse and the keeper's residence were listed on the National Register of Historic Places in 1990.

List of keepers

See also

 List of lighthouses in the United States
 List of lighthouses in Connecticut
 National Register of Historic Places listings in New Haven, Connecticut

References

External links

 Five Mile Point Lighthouse
 Lighthouse Point Park 

Lighthouses completed in 1805
Towers completed in 1805
Lighthouses completed in 1812
Towers completed in 1812
Lighthouses completed in 1847
Long Island Sound
Buildings and structures in New Haven, Connecticut
Tourist attractions in New Haven, Connecticut
Lighthouses on the National Register of Historic Places in Connecticut
Lighthouses in New Haven County, Connecticut
National Register of Historic Places in New Haven, Connecticut
1805 establishments in Connecticut